Byeokje Baseball Stadium is a baseball stadium in Goyang, South Korea. The stadium is used by the Police Baseball Team of the KBO Futures League.

Baseball venues in South Korea
Sports venues in Gyeonggi Province
Sports venues completed in 2006
2006 establishments in South Korea